The Amateurs, originally called The Moguls, is a 2005 comedy film written and directed by Michael Traeger and starring Jeff Bridges. The story revolves around six friends in a small town in the United States who decide to make a full-length amateur adult film.

The film was released under the title The Moguls in the United Kingdom on April 28, 2006. The film was released under the title The Amateurs and opened in limited release in the United States on December 7, 2007.

Plot
Six friends come together to try to find fame and fortune by making the world's most innocent adult movie ever made. Although they have literally no idea what they're doing, they keep at it and are determined to accomplish their goal...no matter what gets in the way.

After the clueless crew finally completes the film, they screen it for the first time at the local bar. The brother of a girl whose scene ultimately was not used (besides some brief shots of her face) barges in, takes the reel off the projector, covers it in whiskey and sets it aflame.

It is revealed that this was the only print they had and that all their work has been lost. However, the cinematographer had been videotaping the entire production process on mini DV tapes. He then edits these down into a completely innocent documentary, minus the nudity and sex scenes, about the trials and tribulations of making (and then losing) their original film. This new version is released as the titular The Amateurs which becomes a critical and financial success on the independent film circuit.

Cast
 Jeff Bridges as Andy 
 Tim Blake Nelson as Barney
 William Fichtner as Otis
 Joe Pantoliano as Some Idiot
 Patrick Fugit as Emmett
 Isaiah Washington as Homer
 Steven Weber as Howard
 Ted Danson as "Moose"
 John Hawkes as Moe
 Jeanne Tripplehorn as Thelma
 Glenne Headly as Helen
 Tom Bower as Floyd
 Lauren Graham as Peggy
 Dawn Didawick as Clara
 Norm O'Neill as Clara's Man
 Alex D. Linz as Billy

References

External links
 
 
 
 
 
 The Amateurs Lebowski Podcast review

2005 films
2000s sex comedy films
American sex comedy films
2000s English-language films
Films about pornography
Self-reflexive films
Qwerty Films films
2005 comedy films
2000s American films